Bloodred Tales-Chapter I – The Crimson Season is  an EP by the German melodic death metal band, Fragments of Unbecoming released by the band's own label in May, 2002. The limited release edition is sold with an extra cardboard-box, three postcards and the promotion flyer. The entire booklet and inlay are a 5-colour-print/iso-scale plus additional silver.

Track listing 

 "Invocation of Senses (Intro)" − 0:35
 "Fragments of Unbecoming" − 3:29
 "Reborn" − 4:02
 "Summer Solstice" − 2:10
 "Bloodred Tales" − 2:15
 "An Arctic Serenade" − 5:44
 "Opening My Heaven's Gate" (Outro) − 3:55

Credits

Band 

 Stefan Weimar - Death Vocals, Guitar
 Sascha Ehrich - Guitar, Acoustic guitars
 Wolle Schellenberg - Bass
 Ingo Maier - Drums

Production and other 

 All music composed by Fragments of Unbecoming in a period from 2000 - 2001.
 All songs arranged by Fragments of Unbecoming in 2002.
 Lyrics by Stefan Weimar and Sascha Ehrich.
 Engineered by Fragments of Unbecoming and Stefan Hahnbuch.
 Mixed and mastered at Studio Stellwerk and Fragments of Unbecoming.
 Produced by Fragments of Unbecoming, co-produced by Stefan Hahnbuch.
 Band photos by A. Maier.
 Cover artwork "The Crimson Season" and booklet design by Sascha Ehrich.
 Fragments of Unbecoming logotype and Sylphony Creations logotype by Sascha Ehrich.

External links 
 Fragments of Unbecoming Discography

Fragments of Unbecoming albums
2002 debut EPs